The 1960 Cork City Council election took place on 29 June as part of that year's local election to elect all 21 seats on Cork City Council. This was the last time the entire county borough of Cork formed a single electoral area. The election was conducted by means of the single transferable vote. There were 72 candidates. The count began on 30 June and concluded in the early hours of 3 July after 63 counts.

Electoral law empowered the Minister for Local Government to split county boroughs into multiple borough electoral areas only if the council requested, which Cork City Council had not done. The Electoral Act 1963 allowed the minister to act unilaterally. After the 1965 boundary extension, the borough was divided into 6 borough electoral districts.

At the 1967 local elections, the larger parties increased their proportion of seats.

Results

The first six candidates elected gained the honorific title alderman; the other 15 were "councillors". Seán McCarthy, John Bermingham and Gus Healy were also elected to Cork County Council from the Cork Rural LEA which bordered the city.

References

1960
Cork City